Al Fong (born c. 1953) is an American gymnastics coach and owner of GAGE Center, a gymnastics club. Fong coached Julissa Gomez and Christy Henrich, Olympic hopefuls for the 1988 Seoul Olympics, who died after a competition accident and from anorexia, respectively. He has since coached two Olympic silver medalists: Terin Humphrey and Courtney McCool.

Personal life
Fong is a second-generation Chinese-American, born and raised in Seattle, Washington. He was a gymnast and earned a gymnastics scholarship to Louisiana State University. Fong is married to former Soviet gymnast Armine Barutyan-Fong, who is a gymnastics coach at GAGE Center. Together they have a daughter, Athena.

Career
1970s

Fong graduated from Louisiana State University in 1975, and became a gymnastics coach that same year. In 1979, Fong started his own gym, the Great American Gymnastics Express (also known as GAGE Center), in Blue Springs, Missouri.  Fong coached six-year-old future world champion Tammy Pendley in Lee's Summit, Missouri.

1980s and 1990s

In the 1980s, Fong coached Julissa Gomez and Christy Henrich. Gomez died after breaking her neck while performing a Yurchenko vault. Henrich died from complications of anorexia nervosa. After Henrich's death, Fong stopped coaching elite gymnastics and instead taught after-school programs.

2000s

He coached Olympic silver medalists Terin Humphrey and Courtney McCool at his gym, GAGE Center, in Blue Springs. Fong has said his coaching style has changed: "There is no yelling or screaming[...]If anybody who knew me 20 years ago saw this, they'd say 'Bulls----".

At a selection camp for the 2003 World Championships, Humphrey was selected as a second alternate. She was not allowed to practice with the U.S. team. Fong commented that the experience was very painful and said Humphrey should have been selected to compete.

Fong was involved in a scoring controversy concerning the men's all-around competition at the 2004 Athens Olympics when Korean Olympic officials lodged a protest against American gymnast Paul Hamms score.

2010s

As of 2019, Fong coached Leanne Wong and Kara Eaker.

Athlete deaths
Julissa Gomez and the Yurchenko vault

Julissa Gomez broke her neck while performing a Yurchenko vault in 1988 during the World Sports Fair in Japan, just before the 1988 Olympic trials. She died as a result of her injuries in hospital.  After the accident Fong said: "One thing is certain...Julissa certainly wouldn't want national team members to stop competing, or want me to quit being the coach that I am". After the accident some coaches supported banning the vault entirely, but Fong said that "a lot of the coaches are concerned about the hysteria going on about this vault[...]This could hamper the development of the sport." He said that banning the vault would put the United States even further behind the Soviets and suggested that coaches should teach the vault to gymnasts when they are younger so they will have more time to develop it.

Another one of Fong's gymnasts, Karen Tiereny, cracked the C-1 vertebra in her neck when she landed on her head performing the Yurchenko vault at the U.S. Olympic Festival in 1987. Tiereny decided she would not perform the vault anymore and has said that Fong continued to encourage her to perform it anyway. Fong insists that he did not pressure Tiereny to continue performing the Yurchenko.

Christy Henrich

He coached Christy Henrich, who missed the 1988 Seoul Olympics by .188. Henrich developed anorexia nervosa after a judge told her she was too heavy at 93 pounds to make the Olympic team. As a result of her illness, she was unable to compete after 1990. She retired from the sport in 1991 and died from multiple organ system failure in 1994 at age 22. Fong had stopped coaching Christy in 1989 and has said that he "kicked her out of the gym for her own good" adding that she had lost the strength needed to complete her routines safely. Henrich has said that Fong called her the "Pillsbury Dough Boy", which Fong has denied.

Fong stopped coaching elite gymnastics for a time after Henrich's death. The best gymnasts left his gym and his reputation as a coach was damaged. He taught after-school programs for a time, until he met nine-year-old Terin Humphrey.

References

American gymnastics coaches
American people of Chinese descent
Living people
People from Seattle
Louisiana State University alumni
Year of birth missing (living people)